is a railway station on the Jōhana Line in city of Nanto, Toyama, Japan, operated by West Japan Railway Company (JR West).

Lines

Layout
The station has a single side platform serving one bi-directional track. The station is unattended.

Adjacent stations

History
The station opened on 30 May 1899. With the privatization of Japanese National Railways (JNR) on 1 April 1987, the station came under the control of JR West.

Passenger statistics
In fiscal 2015, the station was used by an average of 60 passengers daily (boarding passengers only).

Surrounding area
The station is located in a rural area surrounded by farmland.

See also
 List of railway stations in Japan

References

External links

 

Railway stations in Toyama Prefecture
Stations of West Japan Railway Company
Railway stations in Japan opened in 1899
Jōhana Line
Nanto, Toyama